Anthony Nsiah-Asare is a Ghanaian medical officer, academic and health management expert. He has worked in the Ghanaian health sector for close to forty years serving at various management levels. He was the Director General of the Ghana Health Service. He is a member of the New Patriotic Party is currently the Presidential Advisor on Health to Nana Akufo-Addo.

Career 
Anthony Nsiah-Asare prior to his current appointment has worked in the health sector spanning over 36 years in senior management position. He has also worked as a Surgical Specialist at the St Patrick Hospital in Offinso-Ashanti and Tamale Teaching Hospital.

The one time chief executive officer of the Komfo Anokye Teaching Hospital (KATH) also worked as a Consultant General Surgeon for the same hospital.
Between 1997 and 2001, Dr Nsiah-Asare served as a part-time lecturer in Clinical Anatomy at the University for Development Studies (UDS), School of Medical Sciences, Tamale.

Ghana Health Service 
President Nana Akufo-Addo has appointed Dr Anthony Nsiah-Asare as the new Director-General of the Ghana Health Service with effect from March 1, 2017. He takes over from Dr. Ebenezer Appiah-Denkyira who has retired from active service. He handed over to Dr. Patrick Aboagye in November 2019 and appointed as the Presidential Advisor on Health.

See also 

 Ghana Health Service
 Komfo Anokye Teaching Hospital

References 

Living people
Ghanaian civil servants
Year of birth missing (living people)
St. Peter's Boys Senior High School alumni
Ghanaian surgeons
Academic staff of the University for Development Studies